Quinn Chapel AME Church may refer to:
 Quinn Chapel AME Church (Chicago)
 Chestnut Street Baptist Church or Quinn Chapel AME Church, a church in Louisville, Kentucky
 Quinn Chapel AME Church (St. Louis, Missouri)